St. Anthony School is a Roman Catholic private school (grades K-12) located in Milwaukee, Wisconsin, in the Roman Catholic Archdiocese of Milwaukee. Founded in 2009, the school is an extension to St. Anthony Grade School, which was founded in 1872.

History
The high school began classes on August 31, 2009, with an enrollment of 107 students. It was the first new Catholic high school in the Milwaukee archdiocese in more than 25 years and the first Catholic high school on the south side within the boundaries of the city of Milwaukee since St. Mary's Academy closed in 1991.

Curriculum
St. Anthony School is an official international baccalaureate candidate school, and is expected to be certified for the 2015-16 school year.

Athletics
In 2012, the boys soccer team won the Division III state championship in the second year of the program's existence.

References

Roman Catholic Archdiocese of Milwaukee
Educational institutions established in 1872
Catholic secondary schools in Wisconsin
High schools in Milwaukee
1872 establishments in Wisconsin